At least three Japanese warships have been named Natsushio:

 , a  launched in 1939 and sunk in 1942.
 , a  launched in 1962 and struck in 1978.
 , a  launched in 1990 and struck in 2010.

Japanese Navy ship names
Japan Maritime Self-Defense Force ship names